Clark Hamilton (January 12, 1955 - August 19, 2022) was a former professional ice hockey player. Hamilton was selected in the third round by the Detroit Red Wings in the 1975 NHL Amateur Draft, and he was also selected in the third round by the Indianapolis Racers in the 1975 WHA Amateur Draft.

Hamilton was born in Etobicoke, Ontario and grew up in the Islington neighbourhood. Prior to becoming a professional hockey player, Hamilton played four seasons of NCAA hockey with Notre Dame. As a professional, Hamilton played 97 games in the CHL with the Kansas City Red Wings (1977–79) and Cincinnati Stingers (1979–80). Hamilton also played 40 games in the EHL with the Erie Blades during the 1979-80 season.

Clark (Hammy...and he was known by his friends) passed away in Plano Texas on August 19, 2022.

External links

1955 births
Canadian ice hockey centres
Cincinnati Stingers (CHL) players
Detroit Red Wings draft picks
Erie Blades players
Indianapolis Racers draft picks
Kansas City Red Wings players
Living people
Notre Dame Fighting Irish men's ice hockey players
Sportspeople from Etobicoke
Ice hockey people from Toronto